Mikael Good (born 14 March 1962) is a retired Swedish ice hockey player. Good was part of the Djurgården Swedish champions' team of 1983. Good made 14 Elitserien appearances for Djurgården.

References

Swedish ice hockey players
Djurgårdens IF Hockey players
1962 births
Living people